Atmospheric optics ray tracing codes  - this article list codes for light scattering using ray-tracing technique to study atmospheric optics phenomena such as rainbows and halos. Such particles can be large raindrops or hexagonal ice crystals.  Such codes are one of many approaches to calculations of light scattering by particles.

Geometric optics (ray tracing)

Ray tracing techniques can be applied to study light scattering by spherical and non-spherical particles under the condition that the size of a particle is much larger than the wavelength of light. The light can be considered as collection of separate rays with width of rays much larger than the wavelength but smaller than a particle. Rays hitting the particle undergoes reflection, refraction and diffraction. These rays exit in various directions with different amplitudes and phases. Such ray tracing techniques are used to describe optical phenomena such as rainbow  of halo on hexagonal ice crystals for large particles. 
Review of several mathematical techniques is provided in series of publications.

The 46° halo was first explained as being caused by refractions through ice crystals in 1679 by the French physicist Edmé Mariotte (1620–1684) in terms of light refraction  
Jacobowitz in 1971 was the first to apply the ray-tracing technique to hexagonal ice crystal. Wendling et al. (1979) extended Jacobowitz's work from  hexagonal ice particle with infinite length to finite length and combined Monte Carlo technique to the ray-tracing simulations.

Classification
The compilation contains information about the electromagnetic scattering by hexagonal ice crystals, large raindrops, and relevant links and applications.

Codes for light scattering by hexagonal ice crystals

Relevant scattering codes
 Discrete dipole approximation codes
 Codes for electromagnetic scattering by cylinders
 Codes for electromagnetic scattering by spheres

External links
Scatterlib - Google Code repository of light scattering codes

See also
 Computational electromagnetics
 Light scattering by particles
 List of atmospheric radiative transfer codes
 Optical properties of water and ice
 Mie theory
 Ray tracing (physics)

References

Science-related lists
Computational science
Scattering, absorption and radiative transfer (optics)
Scattering
Electromagnetic simulation software